Yeon or less commonly Youn (연) is a Korean surname. The name may correspond to the Chinese surnames Yan (燕, 延) or Lian (連). The hanja 延 is much more common than 燕 and 連. Yeon may also refer to the extinct surname (淵).

Origin

燕

燕 (제비 연 jebi yeon) was the surname of the Yeon clan, one of the Great Eight Families of Baekje. This surname is extremely rare in the present-day with a few clans such as the Jeonju Yeon clan and the Jeongpyeong Yeon clan. The character literally means barn swallow. According to the 2015 census, 20 people had this surname.

延
延 (늘일 연 ) is the most common hanja character used for the surname "Yeon". The most common bon-gwan is the Goksan Yeon clan (곡산 연씨), whose ancestor Yeon Gye-ryeong originated from Hongnong Commandery and later went to Goryeo. During the Joseon dynasty, the Japanese surname Nobu (延) was naturalized into Korean as Yeon. According to the 2015 census, 34,766 people had this surname.

連
The Naju Yeon clan uses the hanja character (連, 잇닿을 연 itdaeul yeon) to denote their surname. They are the descendants of Yeon Ju, who contributed to the founding of Goryeo. According to the 2015 census, 59 people had this surname.

淵 (Extinct)

Yeon (淵) was the surname of Yeon Gaesomun, a general of Goguryeo. It became extinct when this family emigrated to the Tang dynasty, with the remaining family members changing their surname due to the naming taboo; the personal name of the first Tang emperor, Li Yuan (李淵) used the character, 淵 and it was illegal for one's surname to be the same as the emperor's name.

Notable people
Yeon Gaesomun, Goguryeo military leader
Yeon Ja-yu, Goguryeo statesman and father of Yeon Gaesomun
Yeon Joon-seok, actor 
Yeon Jung-hoon, actor and television personality
Yeon Sang-ho, film director and screenwriter
Kwangchul Youn, South Korean operatic bass based in Germany

References

Korean-language surnames